This article is about transport in Qatar.

Public transport 

In 2002, the Qatari government launched Mowasalat, a company 100% owned by the government, managed and operated by the state authorities to ensure the smooth provision of integrated ground-transport services for the entire country. Previously, 3,000 privately owned orange taxicabs used to rule the streets of Qatar but the government took them off the roads as they saw them as a threat to the new Mowasalat taxis. There has been much controversy over this move, as it is now very hard to find a taxi in Doha.

Public buses now service over 35 routes covering most locations of Doha with minimal fares making public transport in Qatar an inexpensive solution to the problems of rush hours and parking difficulties.

Mowasalat, under the brand-name Karwa, now operates more than 3,000 new taxi sedans including the recently acquired airport taxis with spacious cabins using 2007 Ford Freestars and more than 120 public buses, school buses, and private-hire coaches. In 2009, the Mowasalat created a world record for the largest parade of buses numbering 300 in all. In addition, its Doha Limousine Service has 100 standard limousines and 200 Jaguar XJ VIP units that are mostly placed at the Doha International Airport and at major hotels.

However, those without personal transportation still face difficulties to move around since the number of taxis is much lower than the actual need of the population. All buses operate only on specific assigned lines based at the Central Bus Stations at Al-Ghanem area of the old city.

The Ministry of Transport and Communications stated that Public bus ridership has increased by 40% between 2015 and 2018.

Railways 
 
In August 2008 Qatari Diar Real Estate Investment created a joint venture with Deutsche Bahn of Germany, Qatar Railway Development Company to plan a railway network in Qatar.
On 22 November 2009 Deutsche Bahn and Qatari signed a memorandum of Agreement to build high-speed railway lines and underground transport networks in Qatar and Bahrain. This agreement has never been executed.
The Qatar Railways Development Company (QRDC) was created in 2011, and, soon after this, it has been decided that Qatar Rail will  be the sole owner and manager of Qatar's rail network and will be responsible for the design, construction, commissioning, operation and maintenance of the entire rail network and systems. However,

Qatar Rail consist of:

 Doha Metro (Contract awarded for civil works, Rolling Stocks and Systems).
 Light rail transit for Lusail (the other LRT systems in Doha, namely for Education City and Hamad International Airport are managed outside Qatar Rail.
 Long Distance.

The total length of the Qatar Rail network consist of approximately: 
 750 km of track
 100 stations for both passenger and freight

In June 2013, Qatar Rail awarded four design and build contracts worth approximately $8.2 billion for phase one of the Doha metro. The project will include four rail lines and an underground section in the center of the capital Doha and will link stadiums for the 2022 World Cup soccer tournament. The contracts were for the Red Line North project, the Red Line South project, the Green Line project and another one to design and build the metro's major stations. The projects are expected to employ more than 20,000 workers at its peak, construction is scheduled to begin later this year for completion by 2019. Construction of the metro was originally planned to start in the first quarter of 2010.

Doha Metro's Red Line became the first line officially opened to the public on 8 May 2019. This was followed by the launch of the Gold Line on 21 November 2019, and the opening of the Green Line on 10 December 2019.

Standards 
 Gauge: 
 Brakes: Air
 Couplings (freight): TBA
 Electrification: 25 kV AC

Highways 

Total: 1,230 km
Paved: 1,107 km
Unpaved: 123 km (1996 est.)

Most of the main roads in this tiny country have been updated to multilane, double carriageway motorways, including the following:

 Al Shamal Highway: Doha - Ar Ru'ays. Length: 109 km.
 Doha Highway: Doha - Mesaieed. Length: 57 km.
 Garafat Ar Rayyan Highway: Doha - Dukhan. Length: 82 km.
 Al Khor Highway: Doha - Al Khor. Length: 45 km.
 Salwa Highway (constructed in 1970): Doha - As Salwa. Length: 100 km.
 Umm Bab Highway: Dukhan - Salwa Highway. length: 61 km.
 Al Majd Road (constructed in 2017 as the "Orbital Highway") is the longest highway in Qatar, running at a length of 195 km from south-to-north. It begins in Mesaieed and extends north towards Ras Laffan on the coast.

Pipelines 
Crude Oil 235 km; Natural Gas 400 km

Ports and harbours

Persian Gulf 
 Doha Port
 Halul Island Port
 Umm Sa'id Port
 Ras Laffan Port
 Hamad Port
 Ar Ru'ays Port

Merchant marine 
Total: 24 ships (1,000 GT or over) totalling 721,756 GT/
Ships by type: cargo 10, combination ore/oil 2, container 7, petroleum tanker 5 (1999 est.)

Airports 
Hamad International Airport is the only international passenger airport in Qatar. There are five other airfields in the country, three paved, two unpaved.

See also 
Transport in Doha

References

External links